The French Key is a 1946 American mystery film directed by Walter Colmes and written by Frank Gruber. The film stars Albert Dekker, Mike Mazurki, Evelyn Ankers, John Eldredge, Frank Fenton and Selmer Jackson. The film was released on May 18, 1946, by Republic Pictures.

Plot
The French Key is an adaptation of Gruber's novel of the same title, one of more than a dozen in a series featuring detective Johnny Fletcher. In this film Fletcher and his partner return to their hotel room and find a corpse clutching a gold coin. Attempting to solve the case, they deal with coin collectors and a pool room fight in addition to spending a night in jail.

Cast   
Albert Dekker as Johnny Fletcher
Mike Mazurki as Sam Cragg
Evelyn Ankers as Janet Morgan
John Eldredge as John Holterman
Frank Fenton as Horatio Vedder
Selmer Jackson as Walter Winslow
Byron Foulger as Peabody
Joe DeRita as Detective Fox
Marjorie Manners as Betty Winslow 
David Gorcey as Eddie Miller
Archie Twitchell as Murdock 
Sammy Stein as Percy
Alan Ward as Madigan
Walter Soderling as George Polson
Emmett Vogan as Desk Clerk

References

External links
 

1946 films
1946 mystery films
American black-and-white films
American mystery films
American detective films
Republic Pictures films
Films directed by Walter Colmes
1940s English-language films
1940s American films